Sanjib Sarkar is an Indian sound designer, music director and film score composer

Early life

He was born on 16 November 1986 in Bankura, West Bengal, India, to Bengali parents, Debi Prasad Sarkar  and Ratna Sarkar. He stayed in Bankura until he was 18, when Sarkar moved to Kolkata after completing Higher Secondary from Akui Union high School, He started learning classical music from his  Guruji Sri Provash Dey and received training in Sound Design from Sri. Pankaj Seal (SRFTI)

Education 

He is an alumnus of Bangabasi Morning College (University of Calcutta).

Career

After completed his graduation he started composing jingle music for various brands including:

 Emami Healthy & Tasty Oil, 
 Asian Paints,
 MTS Mobile,
 Trendy World Garments, 
 Turtle Clothing, 
 Cookme (Spice), 
 Anmol Feeds,
 Cute Soap,
 Bandhan Bank

Film music

Sarkar's first film score was for Sudhamoy Babur Advut Galpo, directed by Anindya Chatterjee and released in 2011. In 2014, his score forMasoom, which included the song "Halka Nesha Halka", became popular online. He received several awards for the music of Umformung: The Transformation, including the Best Music Director Award from "Cine India Film Festivel" (CIFF 2014), Mumbai, the "Free Spirit Film Festivel" (FSFF 2014) McLeodganj, and the Euro Film Festival 2016 in Spain. In 2017, he received Best Music Award for the film Paradiso at the NIFF film festival in Delhi.

Discography

Television

He composed title tracks for television series including:
 "Disha"
 "Mukti Snan"
 "Hiyar Majhe"
 "Arundhutir Chiti"
 "Ektu Sukher Khonje"

He composed music for various Horror Films including:

Other music

He also composed music for various corporate films, short films and documentary films including:
 Expedition Challenge for NIBS
 Larsen & Toubro Tubes for Anthelion Technology
 Reincarneation (Documentary) 		
 Poisonman Vs Ross
 Rhythm Of Soul (Bengali Short Film)
 Sri Gourio Math
 H2O (Bengali Short Film)
 Putul Nach (Bengali Short Film)
 Dhoni (Bengali Short Film)
 Nayer Meye (Bengali Short Film)
 Mofu Tofu (Bengali Short Film)
 Rojnamcha (Daily Journal)
 She (Bengali Short Film) 
 Status (Bengali Short Film)

Albums

Soundtrack

Awards

See also 
 List of Indian film music directors

References

External links
 
 

1986 births
Living people
Musicians from West Bengal
Indian male playback singers
Indian male composers
Bollywood playback singers
21st-century classical composers
21st-century Indian male singers
21st-century Indian singers